A cineplex is a multiplex, a movie theatre with several screens, coming from the words cinema and complex.

Cineplex most commonly refers to:

 Cineplex Entertainment, a Canadian entertainment company based in Toronto, Ontario.

Cineplex may also refer to:

, a German cinema chain
 Cineplex Odeon Corporation, a former Canadian movie theatre operators, present in Canada and the United States.
 Loews Cineplex Entertainment, a former and oldest movie theatre chain operating in North America.

See also
Cineplexx (disambiguation)
 Movie theater
 List of movie theater chains